The Jura River may refer to:
Jūra, river in Lithuania
Jura River (Papua New Guinea), river near Agaun, Milne Bay Province, Papua New Guinea
Jura River (California), a hypothetical  ancient river in the California Mother Lode, named for the Jurassic Period 
Jura River (Paris), mythological river under Paris, France